The governor of Capiz is the chief executive of the provincial government of Capiz, Philippines.

The provincial government of Capiz had jurisdiction over Romblon from 1907 until 1917 and Aklan from 1901 until 1956.

The current governor is Fredenil H. Castro of the Lakas-CMD  He served as Representative of 2nd District of the province of capiz from 2001-2010 to 2013-2022

Governors of Capiz

References

External links 

Capiz